Vasilyevka is a rural locality (a selo) and the administrative center of Vasilyevsky Selsoviet of Belogorsky District, Amur Oblast, Russia. The population was 2,130 as of 2018. There are 18 streets.

Geography 
Vasilyevka is located on the left bank of the Tom River, 11 km southeast of Belogorsk (the district's administrative centre) by road. Mezhdugranka is the nearest rural locality.

References 

Rural localities in Belogorsky District